Tim Alexander is a visual effects supervisor.

Alexander and his fellow visual effects artists were nominated for an Academy Award for Best Visual Effects for the 2013 film The Lone Ranger.

References

External links
Official Website at ILM.com

Living people
Best Visual Effects BAFTA Award winners
Visual effects supervisors
Year of birth missing (living people)
Place of birth missing (living people)